Michael Brown (born Michael David Lookofsky, April 25, 1949 – March 19, 2015) was an American keyboardist and songwriter, most notable for his work with the Left Banke. He was born in Brooklyn, New York, the son of violinist and arranger Harry Lookofsky.

The Left Banke
Brown was the principal songwriter for the 1960s baroque-pop group the Left Banke, writing their two biggest hits, "Walk Away Renee" and "Pretty Ballerina". He also was a harpsichordist and clavinet player for the band. "Walk Away Renee" was also a top 20 hit for the Four Tops, having reached No. 15 on the soul singles chart, and No. 14 on the Billboard Hot 100.

Internal band tensions saw Brown leave the Left Banke in late 1967, prior to the completion of their second record. Brown, along with Bert Sommer, co-wrote the minor mid-1968 hit "And Suddenly", initially for Brown's version of the new Left Banke, with Sommer also slated as lead singer. The song went on to be recorded by The Cherry People, peaking at #45 single on the Billboard Hot 100. The flip side of the Left Banke version of the single was "Ivy, Ivy" written by Tom Feher. In 1969, Brown became involved in the band Montage (again collaborating with Sommer and Feher in songwriting), as well as producing the band's self-titled album. He briefly returned to the Left Banke, producing the single "Myrah" in 1969 and Left Banke vocalist Steve Martin Caro's solo single "Two By Two".

Later career
In 1971 Brown and vocalist Ian Lloyd formed Stories. They were introduced by their fathers, Peter Buonconsiglio  and Harry Lookofsky, who had worked together as session violinists. A self-titled album and single – "I'm Coming Home" (No. 42, 1972) – followed.

The band recorded a second album About Us in (1973). Brown left the band prior to the recording of Hot Chocolate's "Brother Louie", which became a No. 1 hit for Stories.

Subsequently, he became involved with The Beckies. Brown briefly reunited with the Left Banke at a New York performance in June 2013.

Death
On March 19, 2015, Brown died at age 65 of heart failure in Englewood, New Jersey. He is survived by his wife Yvonne and sons Skylar and Adrian.

References

Further reading
Bloom, Ken. American Song. The Complete Musical Theater Companion. 1877-1995’’, Vol. 2, 2nd edition, Schirmer Books, 1996.
Clarke, Donald (Ed.). The Penguin Encyclopedia of Popular Music, Viking, 1989.
Larkin, Colin. The Guinness Encyclopedia of Popular Music, Guinness Publishing, 1992.
Larkin, Colin. The Encyclopedia of Popular Music'', 3rd edition, Macmillan, 1998.

External links

1949 births
2015 deaths
Singer-songwriters from New York (state)
American keyboardists
American male singer-songwriters
20th-century American singers
Baroque pop musicians
20th-century American male singers
21st-century American male singers
21st-century American singers